List of airlines of South Korea
 List of airlines of North Korea

Airlines